These were the team rosters of the nations participating in the Girls' ice hockey tournament of the 2016 Winter Youth Olympics. Each team was permitted a roster of 15 skaters and 2 goaltenders.

Czech Republic 
The following is the Czech roster for the Girls' ice hockey tournament at the 2016 Winter Youth Olympics.

Head coach: Rudolf Valla

 Kristýna Bláhová
 Nikola Dýcková
 Magdalena Erbenová
 Martina Exnerová
 Alexandra Halounová
 Sandra Halounová
 Karolina Hornická
 Karolina Kotounová
 Klára Jandušíková
 Karolína Juřicová
 Anna Kotounová
 Šárka Krejníková
 Laura Lerchová
 Veronika Lorencová
 Barbora Machalová
 Natálie Mlýnková
 Adéla Škrdlová

Norway 
The following is the Norwegian roster for the Girls' ice hockey tournament at the 2016 Winter Youth Olympics.

Head coach: Laura Rollins

 Ingrid Berge
 Marthe Brunvold
 Nora Christophersen
 Mabel Endrerud
 Karen Forgaard
 Hedda Håvarstein
 Mia Isdahl
 Karen Jensen
 Thea Jørgensen
 Stine Kjellesvik
 Maren Knudsen
 Kaja Kristensen
 Malin Kristensen
 Ena Marie Nystrøm
 Emilie Olsen
 Kamilla Olsen
 Millie Sirum

Slovakia 
The following is the Slovak roster for the Girls' ice hockey tournament at the 2016 Winter Youth Olympics.

Head coach: Andrej Schöber

 Patrícia Agostonová
 Paula Cagáňová
 Alexandra Čorňáková
 Michaela Hájniková
 Kinga Horváthová
 Klaudia Kleinová
 Barbora Koysová
 Lívia Kubeková
 Nina Kučerková
 Simona Ležovičová
 Zuzana Majeríková
 Sylvia Maťašová
 Andrea Rišianová
 Nikola Rumanová
 Dominika Sedláková
 Laura Sulíková
 Diana Vargová

Switzerland 
The following is the Suiss roster for the Girls' ice hockey tournament at the 2016 Winter Youth Olympics.

Head coach: Andrea Kröni

 Sina Bachmann
 Sydney Berta
 Tina Brand
 Yaël Brich
 Oona Emmenegger
 Rahel Enzler
 Ramona Forrer
 Justine Forster
 Janine Hauser
 Saskia Maurer
 Lisa Rüedi
 Noemi Ryhner
 Jessica Schlegel
 Gionina Spiess
 Nicole Vallario
 Stefanie Wetli
 Lara Zimmermann

Sweden 
The following is the Sweden roster for the Girls' ice hockey tournament at the 2016 Winter Youth Olympics.

Head coach: Ylva Lindberg

 Anna Amholt
 Josefin Bouveng
 Fanny Brolin
 Jennifer Carlsson
 Wilma Carlsson
 Julia Gustafsson
 Therese Järnkrok
 Lina Ljungblom
 Sofie Lundin
 Ronja Mogren
 Maja Nyhlén Persson
 Linnea Sjölund
 Madelene Strömgren
 Mina Waxin
 Madelen Westerlund
 Agnes Wilhelmsson
 Ethel Wilhelmsson

References

Ice hockey at the 2016 Winter Youth Olympics